Meemaw or Mee-maw may refer to:
 meemaw or mee-mawing, speaking with exaggerated mouth movements to allow lip reading
 Meemaw or Maw-maw, an affectionate term for a Grandmother